The Sault Ste. Marie Marlboros, also known as the Canadian Soo and Soo Algonquins, was a professional ice hockey team from Sault Ste. Marie, Ontario, Canada.  It was the lone Canadian entry in the International Hockey League of 1904–1907, and one of the first, if not the first, openly professional hockey teams in Canada.

The league was formed at the Conference of Hockey Clubs in American Cities in Chicago, Illinois, on November 5, 1904.  The Canadian Soo was represented by J. P. Mooney and J. C. Boyd.  The Canadian representatives presented a revenue-sharing proposal at the meeting.  The idea put forward was that gate receipts should be split 60/40 home/visiting team with a minimum guarantee also in place so that the visiting team's expenses would be met.  The proposal was accepted and the league was formed.

First game
The Canadian Soo Marlboros first game was played against the American Soo Indians on December 14, 1904, at the Sault Ste. Marie, Michigan Ridge Street Ice-A-Torium, the local curling club.  The Canadian Soo played its first home game against the American Soo at the Sault, Ontario curling club on December 19, 1904.

Roster

The lineup from the first Sault Marlboros game as reported in the Sault Star December 8, 1904

 Pete Maltman - Woodstock, Ontario - Goaltender
 Roy Brown - Brantford, Ontario - Point
 Dick O'Leary - Ottawa, Ontario - Cover Point
 Billy Taylor - Brantford, Ontario - Rover
 Charles Corbett - Omemee, Ontario - Left Wing
 Jim McLurg - Sault Ste. Marie, Ontario - Right Wing
 Charles Collins - Collingwood, Ontario - Centre

Notable players
Before the team folded in 1907, Newsy Lalonde, George McNamara and Marty Walsh played for the Soo.  All would go on to play for Stanley Cup winning teams and would all also be inducted into the Hockey Hall of Fame.

References
 Sault Star - November 10, 1904, December 8, 1904
The Origins and Development of the International Hockey League and its effect on the Sport of Professional Ice Hockey in North America Daniel Scott Mason, University of British Columbia, 1992

Notes

 
Sport in Sault Ste. Marie, Ontario
Defunct ice hockey teams in Canada
Ice hockey clubs established in 1904
Sports clubs disestablished in 1907
1904 establishments in Ontario
1907 disestablishments in Ontario